Akira Kurosawa (1910–1998) was a Japanese film director and screenwriter.

Kurosawa may also refer to:
Kurosawa (crater), an impact crater on Mercury
Kurosawa (surname), a Japanese surname
Kurosawa Film Studio, a Japanese film studio
254749 Kurosawa, a main-belt asteroid

See also
Kurosawa Station (disambiguation), multiple railway stations in Japan